Václav Skuhravý (born January 16, 1979) is a Czech ice hockey player, playing currently for HC Energie Karlovy Vary in Czech Extraliga, with whom he is contracted until 2021. He is a forward, and has played for the national team.

International play
Skuhravý first played for the Czech national team in the 2005/06 season, and also played for the national team in the 2008 World Championship.

References

External links

Václav Skuhravý at the official page of HC Energie Karlovy Vary

1979 births
Czech ice hockey forwards
HC Karlovy Vary players
HC Litvínov players
Rytíři Kladno players
Living people
People from Slaný
Sportspeople from the Central Bohemian Region
Sportovní Klub Kadaň players